Haripur Kala is a gram panchayat in Araria district of state Bihar in India.

Villages in Araria district